Aqkol, also spelled Akkol, (Aqköl) is a town in Atyrau Region, southwest Kazakhstan.

References

Atyrau Region
Cities and towns in Kazakhstan